The Universalist Church was a religious denomination, more formally known as Universalist Church of America.

Universalist Church may also refer to:
Universalist Church of West Hartford or the Universalist Church, a church in Connecticut
Universalist Church (Mitchellville, Iowa)
Universalist Church of Westfield Center, a church in Westfield Center, Ohio

See also
List of Unitarian, Universalist, and Unitarian Universalist churches